Wuri or WURI may refer to the following articles:
Wuri, Taichung, a district in Taiwan
Wuri's Family, a South Korean TV show
WCPE, a radio station in North Carolina formerly known as WURI